Henri Brod (June 13, 1799 - April 6, 1839) was a French oboist, instrument builder and composer of the early Romantic Era. Brod was considered a virtuoso and introduced his own innovations in both oboe design and playing style that are still in use today.

Notes

External links 
 

Musicians from Paris
1799 births
1839 deaths
Burials at Montparnasse Cemetery
French classical oboists
Male oboists
19th-century male musicians
19th-century musicians